Wild Waves Theme & Water Park is an amusement park and water park in Federal Way, Washington. Opened in 1977 as The Enchanted Village (with its accompanying water park, Wild Waves, opening in 1984), the park is a popular summer destination in the Pacific Northwest and is one of three waterparks in Washington state. The park's name was reverted to Wild Waves Water Park and Enchanted Village Amusement Park in April 2016, and once again changed to Wild Waves Theme and Water Park in November 2016, as a result of the park's acquisition by EPR Properties.

History

Founding through today.

The Enchanted Village theme park was first opened in 1977 by Byron Betts. The initial  park site held only a half-dozen rides. In 1984, Wild Waves Waterpark was built adjacent to Enchanted Village; the combined amusement complex became known as Enchanted Parks. In 1991, co-owners Michael Moodenbaugh and Jeff Stock paid $8 million for Enchanted Parks. In 1993, Moodenbaugh traded his share of Enchanted Parks, Inc., for shares in their jointly owned amusement park in Amherstburg, Ontario, Canada called Boblo Island Amusement Park, Inc.  In 1993, Jeff Stock purchased several rides from Boblo Island. Stock then sold his shares of Enchanted Parks, Inc., in late 2000 to Six Flags for $19.3 million. In 1997, the park purchased the Loop Corkscrew roller coaster from the defunct Rocky Point Amusement Park in Warwick, Rhode Island and renamed the ride the Wild Thing. In 2002 and 2003, major expansion took place, with the addition of several new attractions, many manufactured by Zamperla and S&S Power. Also in 2002, approximately 1000 seasonal workers were employed for positions as rides operators and food service workers. Many of these seasonal workers are also students of local high schools. The park's name was reverted to Enchanted Village and Wild Waves Water Park for the 2016 season to once again split the park into two separate parks instead of one. This was accomplished by having a second entrance at the top of the parking lot to enter Enchanted Village and the main entrance was used to enter Wildwaves Water Park. Ticket holders could purchase a pass to just Wildwaves or just Enchanted Village. they could also purchase a more expensive park hopper pass. Season Pass Members got park hopper access free with their purchase. In the 2017 season, this system was removed and the entire park became Wildwaves Theme and Water Park. This change was due to many complaints that the park hopping ticket system was too complicated. In 2020, the park did not open due to Covid-19. Tickets and season passes were rolled over into 2021. During the 2021 season, there were many covid mitigation strategies in place such as reservations, distancing, and masks.

Ownership changes

In April 2007, Six Flags sold the park to Orlando-based real estate investment trust CNL Income Properties, which leased the park to PARC Management.

In January 2010, PARC Management had defaulted on its lease with CNL for Wild Waves and a majority of its other parks. Wild Waves was then placed under the new management of Norpoint Entertainment (owned by previous Wild Waves owner Jeff Stock). Stock implemented many changes to the park in 2011 including a new water ride for that season.

With the CNL Income Properties acquisition, the park was named Wild Waves Theme & Water Park. Other parks owned by CNL included Darien Lake Theme Park Resort, Elitch Gardens, Frontier City, SplashTown Waterpark, White Water Bay, and Waterworld California, all of which were bought in a $312 million purchase from Six Flags.

In November 2016, Wild Waves and the other CNL properties were sold to EPR Properties, based in Kansas City, Missouri. The total price of all the properties was $456 million, although there was no specific price disclosed for Wild Waves. The parks were placed under the management of Premier Parks, LLC.

August 2016 drowning accident

On August 20, 2016, a 33-year-old man died in the Activity Pool due to drowning. A police report noted multiple missed chances to attempt a rescue. According to the report, children reported a body at the bottom of the pool to a lifeguard, who "believed that they were pranking him and did not think anything of it." In a statement released by police, Wild Waves said they actively reviewed the accident, their safety protocols, and the actions taken by staff.

Rides

Roller Coasters

Water rides

Konga Slides
Konga River
Wave Pool
Hooks Lagoon
Activity Pool
Zooma Falls
Raging River Ride
Riptide
Pacific Plunge Slide Complex (formerly called Mountain Dew Slide Complex)

Thrill rides

Family rides

Kiddie rides

Former Rides 

 Warming Tubs (Closed 2020)
 Ring of Fire (Closed 2020)
 Space Racer (Closed 2020)
 The Paratrooper (Closed 2020)
 Falling Star (Closed 2011)
 Tip Top (Closed 2018)
Downhill Tubin' (Closed 2020)
 Speed Slides/Hydro Slides and Green Slides (Closed 2014) Later replaced by Pacific Plunge Slides in 2015

Rides announced but never built 

 The Enterprise (construction began but was halted for a unknown reason, does not operate today, planned to be in the ride area below Soarin' Eagle Zip Line, Announced 2016, as of 2021, has not opened)
 Shark Frenzy (Announced 2020, but was halted due to covid. May return in 2022 season or later)
 Wave Pool: There is a wave pool, but in 2020, it was supposed to get a new wave system and a new screen. It has since revived both items.

Services 
 Cabana rentals
 Locker rentals
 Tube rentals
 Lost and found
 First aid
 ATM

Gallery

References

External links

Wild Waves Official Website
Wild Waves & Enchanted Village on Ultimate Rollercoaster
Wild Waves section of CoasterGallery.com

Amusement parks in Washington (state)
Western (genre) theme parks
Federal Way, Washington
Buildings and structures in King County, Washington
Tourist attractions in King County, Washington
CNL Lifestyle Properties
Former PARC Management theme parks
Former Six Flags theme parks
Premier Parks, LLC
Amusement parks opened in 1977
1977 establishments in Washington (state)